Dynamo Leningrad was a bandy club which existed from 1924-1965 in Saint Petersburg. During that time, Saint Petersburg was called Leningrad.

The club won the bronze medals in the Soviet Union championship in 1936. The club was the runner-up finalist in the Soviet Cup in 1947. The club won the local Leningrad championship in 1935, 1936, 1938, 1939, 1941, 1945, 1946, 1947.

Well-known players and coaches in the club were, among others, Mikhail Butusov and Valentin Fyodorov.

Sources
The information in this article as of 23 July 2015 is based on the corresponding article on Russian Wikipedia, which names the book Соснин В.И., Щеглов М.И., Юрин В.Л. Хоккей с мячом: Энциклопедия. — М: Новые технологии, 2009. — 808 с. —  as its source.

Bandy clubs in the Soviet Union
Bandy clubs established in 1924
Sports clubs disestablished in 1965
Defunct bandy clubs
Sports clubs in Saint Petersburg
1924 establishments in Russia
1965 disestablishments in Russia